Nyaungdon Township is a township of Maubin District in the Ayeyarwady Division of Myanmar.

It can withstand a load of 75 tons. It was completed in November 2011.

References

Townships of Ayeyarwady Region